Tylee is a surname. Notable people with the surname include::

André Tylee, English psychiatrist
Arthur Kellam Tylee, Canadian officer
James Tylee, American politician 
Marion Tylee, New Zealand artist

See also
Ty Lee, a character in the television series Avatar: The Last Airbender